This is a list of regions and highly urbanized cities of the Philippines by GDP and GDP per capita according to the data by the Philippine Statistics Authority.

Data for 2021 estimates (international US$ using 2021 PPP conversion factor from the International Monetary Fund).

Regions by GDP

Regions by GDP per capita

Highly urbanized cities (HUCs) by GDP
Figures exclude cities in Metro Manila, and some cities in the rest of the Philippines.

Highly urbanized cities (HUCs) by GDP per capita
Figures exclude cities in Metro Manila, and some cities in the rest of the Philippines.

See also 
 List of ASEAN country subdivisions by GDP

References

Gross state product
Economy of the Philippines by province
Economy of the Philippines-related lists
 GDP
Philippines